Grischa Prömel (born 9 January 1995) is a German footballer who plays as a midfielder for Bundesliga club 1899 Hoffenheim.

Club career
Prömel began his professional career with Karlsruher SC having joined them from TSG Hoffenheim's second team in 2015. In June 2017, after playing more than 40 times, Prömel left Karlsruher SC following their relegation from 2. Bundesliga and signed a three-year contract with 1. FC Union Berlin. He was sent off via a straight red card late on in his second game for his new club against Nuremberg which resulted in a two-match suspension.

On 1 July 2022, Prömel returned to 1899 Hoffenheim on a free transfer.

International career
He was part of the squad for the 2016 Summer Olympics, where Germany won the silver medal.

Honours

International
Germany
Summer Olympic Games silver medal: 2016

References

External links
 
 
 
 
 

1995 births
Living people
Footballers from Stuttgart
Association football midfielders
German footballers
TSG 1899 Hoffenheim II players
Karlsruher SC players
1. FC Union Berlin players
TSG 1899 Hoffenheim players
2. Bundesliga players
Footballers at the 2016 Summer Olympics
Olympic footballers of Germany
Medalists at the 2016 Summer Olympics
Olympic silver medalists for Germany
Olympic medalists in football
Germany under-21 international footballers
Bundesliga players